Tooth gemination is a dental phenomenon that appears to be two teeth developed from one.  There is one main crown with a cleft in it that, within the incisal third of the crown, looks like two teeth, though it is not two teeth. The number of the teeth in the arch will be normal.

Signs and symptoms 
 Misaligned teeth can lead to chewing difficulty and damage adjacent structures
 Occlusion affected, causing deviation 
 Asymmetry of the dental arch due to enlarged crown
 Aesthetic problem
 Delay or obstruct the eruption of adjacent tooth 
 Tooth anatomy making the surface hard to clean and increase susceptibility of dental decay and periodontal disease

Cause 
The cause of gemination is still unknown. However, there are a few possible factors contributing to gemination:
 Vitamin deficiency
 Hormonal irregularities
 Infection or inflammation of areas near to the developing tooth bud
 Drug induced
 Genetic predisposition
 Radiotherapy that caused damage to the developing tooth germ

Mechanism
The phenomenon of gemination arises when two teeth develop from one tooth bud and, as a result, the patient has an extra tooth, in contrast to  fusion, where the patient would appear to be missing one tooth.  
Fused teeth arise through union of two normally separated tooth germs, and depending upon the stage of development of the teeth at the time of union, it may be either complete or incomplete. On some occasions, two independent pulp chambers and root canals can be seen. However, fusion can also be the union of a normal tooth bud to a supernumerary tooth germ. In these cases, the number of teeth is also normal and differentiation from gemination may be very difficult, if not impossible. In geminated teeth, division is usually incomplete and results in a large tooth crown that has a single root and a single canal. It is an asymptomatic condition.

The prevalence of gemination or fusion is 2.5% in primary dentition, and 0.1 - 0.2% in permanent dentition. It is more frequently observed in primary than permanent dentition; anterior than posterior teeth; unilaterally than bilaterally. It commonly occurs in the primary upper incisors.

Diagnosis 
 Clinical examination
 Radiographs - shown as two crowns arising from one single root

Treatment 
 Patient should be advised to maintain a good oral hygiene to prevent plaque accumulation.
 Fissure sealants and resin restorations for deep grooves and fissures to prevent dental caries.
 Orthodontic treatment 
 Reshape and restore teeth with appropriate material.
 Root canal treatment, followed by the reduction of medio-distal width of the tooth. Restore teeth with crown.
 Root canal treatment then surgically divide the tooth into two teeth.
 If the tooth is not suitable for root canal treatment, then extraction could be considered. Fixed or removable prosthetic may be needed after extraction.
 Transplantation of supernumerary teeth to replace the geminated tooth.
Before root canal treatment or extraction are carried out, the clinician should have thorough knowledge about the root canal morphology to avoid complications.

Related abnormalities of the dentition 
Amelogenesis imperfecta
Dentinogenesis imperfecta
Hyperdontia - More than the average number of teeth
Anodontia - Lack of tooth development

References

External links 

Developmental tooth disorders